The Bayer designations q Velorum and Q Velorum are distinct. Due to technical limitations, both designations link here. For the star
q Velorum, see HD 88955
Q Velorum, see HD 88206

Velorum, q
Vela (constellation)